Yaco is a location in the La Paz Department in Bolivia. It is the seat of the Yaco Municipality, the third municipal section of the José Ramón Loayza Province.

References 

Populated places in La Paz Department (Bolivia)